Holam  (modern , , formerly) is a Hebrew niqqud vowel sign represented by a dot above the upper left corner of the consonant letter. For example, here the holam appears after the letter mem ‎: . In modern Hebrew, it indicates the mid back rounded vowel, and is transliterated as an o.

When it is used with a mater lectionis, the holam is called holam male ("full holam"), and without it the holam is called holam haser ("deficient holam").

Appearance
Letter-spacing is not supposed to be affected by it, although some buggy computer fonts may add an unneeded space before the next letter.

If vav is used as a mater lectionis, the holam appears above the vav. This means a holam with  may, in fact, appear in the same place as a regular holam haser.

(These dots may or may not appear merged on your screen, as that depends on your device's Hebrew font.)

Usage
Holam male is, in general, the most common way to write the  sound in modern spelling with niqqud. If a word has Holam male in spelling with niqqud, the mater lectionis letter  is without any exception retained in spelling without niqqud, both according to the spelling rules of the Academy of the Hebrew Language and in common practice.

The use of holam haser is restricted to certain word patterns, although many common words appear in them. In most cases the Academy's spelling rules mandate that the  will be written even when the spelling with niqqud does not have it. The normative exceptions from this rule are listed below. The Academy's standard is not followed perfectly by all speakers, and common deviations from it are also noted below.

For further complications involving Kamatz katan and Hataf kamatz, see the article Kamatz.

 In words, in which the penultimate syllable has the vowel  and is stressed (sometimes called segolate): 
  ('diameter') 
  ('radiance', Zohar), 
  ('brightness', Nogah), 
The tendency is especially strong when the words can be used as personal names.
 When Kubutz is changed to holam before guttural letters in the passive binyan Pual due to tashlum dagesh (a vowel-change due to the inability of guttural letters to carry a dagesh): 
  ('fancy'), 
  ('was explained'), . Without niqqud: מפואר‎, פורש.
 In words which have the pattern /CaCoC/ in the singular and become /CəCuCCim/ with Kubutz in the plural, especially names of colors: 
  ('orange'), pl.   
  ('round'), pl.  . 
 When the last letter of the root is guttural, holam haser is preserved due to tashlum dagesh: 
  ('black'), pl.  .
 Without niqqud: כתום‎, כתומים‎, עגול‎, עגולים‎, שחור‎, שחורים‎. 
 A similar pattern, in which the last letter of the root is not doubled in declension, has holam male in the base form, which is preserved in declension: 
 sg.  ('big'), pl.  . 
 In three words, a holam male is changed to a shuruk in declension: 
  ('place of living'), pl.   
  ('escape'), pl.  ; 
  ('sweet'), pl.  .
 Similar to the above is the pattern /CəCaCCoC/, with reduplication of the second and third letters of the root: 
  ('crooked'), pl.  . Without niqqud: פתלתול‎, פתלתולים.
 In the future, infinitive and imperative forms of most verbs in binyan Qal: 
   ('I shall close'),  ('to close'),  ('close!'), . Without niqqud: אסגור‎, לסגור‎, סגור.
 In words, whose roots' second and third letter are the same, in which case in declension the holam changes to Kubutz after which there will be a dagesh:
  all, decl.   ('all of her'), root כ־ל־ל‎ 
   ('most'), decl.   ('most of him'), root ר־ב־ב‎
  ('drum'), pl.  , root ת־פ־פ‎ 
  ('stronghold'), pl.  , root ע־ז־ז‎ 
 The standard spelling without niqqud for all of them except  in construct state is with : כול‎, כולה‎, רוב‎, רובו‎, תוף‎, תופים‎, מעוז‎, מעוזים.
 Several common words are spelled with a holam haser in the Bible, but the Academy mandates that they be spelled with holam male in modern Hebrew, among them:
  ('force'),  
  ('brain'),  
  ('a precious stone', in modern Hebrew 'diamond'), 
   ('very'),  
 ‎ ('suddenly'), 
 The participle of most verbs in binyan Qal is often written with holam haser in the Bible, but always with holam male in modern Hebrew. 

Holam with other matres lectionis
In the Bible some words are irregularly and inconsistently spelled with ה as a mater lectionis: 
 ‎ alongside ‎, e.g.  alongside ‎,  etc.
 but the number of these irregularities was brought to minimum in modern Hebrew.
 In the future forms of several verbs whose roots' first letter is Alef:
  ('you shall eat'), root א־כ־ל‎, without niqqud תאכל.
This always happens in the roots א־ב־ד ('perish'), א־ב־י ('wish'), א־כ־ל ('eat'), א־מ־ר ('say'), אפי ('bake') and less consistently in the roots א־ה־ב ('love'), א־ח־ז ('hold'), א־ס־ף ('collect'), א־ת־י ('come').
 ‎ .
 In the infinitive form of a small number of verbs whose roots' last letter is Alef:  ('upon becoming full'), root מ־ל־א‎.
 In the following words the mater lectionis is always Alef (א‎):
  ('this' fem.), 
  ('no'), 
  ('scales'), without niqqud מאזניים‎
  ('wineskin'), 
  ('sheep' or 'goats'), 
  ('head'), 
  ('left'), 
 In the following words the mater lectionis is always He (ה‎):
  ('such'), 
  ('here'), 
  ('where?'), 
 In the absolute infinitive form of verbs which end in He:  ( 'to be'). This form is common in the Bible, but in modern Hebrew it is not productive and it is preserved only in fossilized sayings. For example, a common opening for fairy tales,  ('there once was'),  is written היה היה without niqqud.

Holam without vav in personal names
Some examples of usage of holam without  in personal names:
 The name Aharon is spelled with holam haser in the Bible. In modern Hebrew both אהרן and אהרון are used.
 Several other names of places and people are spelled with holam and Alef in the Bible include Yoshiyahu (Josiah), Dor (in modern Hebrew ) and No Amon (the Hebrew name of Thebes).
 The word  ('priest'),  is spelled with holam haser in the Bible. It is a common Jewish last name, Cohen.
 Some personal names, such as Ohad, Zohar and Nogah, are sometimes spelled without  in modern writing without niqqud, although this varies from person to person.
 God's name Adonai is written with holam haser to distinguish it from the word "Lord" used for humans. When the Tetragrammaton is written with niqqud, it follows that of Adonai, so it is written with holam haser, too. For religious reasons writing Adonai and the Tetragrammaton is avoided in modern religious texts except in direct quotes from the Bible. They rarely appear in secular modern Hebrew texts and their spelling there is inconsistent.
 The name Elohim is written with holam haser in the Bible, although its singular form Eloah is usually written with holam male.

Pronunciation
The following table contains the pronunciation and transliteration of the different holams in reconstructed historical forms and dialects using the International Phonetic Alphabet. The transcription in IPA is above and the transliteration is below.

Any letter can be used.

Vowel length comparison
These vowel lengths are not manifested in modern Hebrew. In addition, the short o is usually promoted to a long o in Israeli writing for the sake of disambiguation. As well, the short o and long a  have the same niqqud.

Computer encoding

In computers there are three ways to distinguish the vowel  and the consonant-vowel combination  + .
 By using the Unicode character U+05BA HEBREW POINT HOLAM HASER FOR VAV: .
 By the precomposed character, U+FB4B (HTML Entity (decimal) &#64331;)

See also
 Niqqud
 Zero-width non-joiner
 Combining Grapheme Joiner

References

Niqqud